Thaumantis odana, Malayan Jungle Glory, is a butterfly in the family Nymphalidae. It was described by Jean Baptiste Godart in 1824. It is found in the Indomalayan realm.

Subspecies
T. o. odana (Java)
T. o. cyclops Röber, 1904 (Borneo)
T. o. pishuna Fruhstorfer, 1905 (Peninsular Malaya, Thailand)
T. o. paramita Fruhstorfer, 1905 (Sumatra)
T. o. yantiva Fruhstorfer, 1911 (Nias)
T. o. wedana Fruhstorfer, 1911 (Java)
T. o. panwila Fruhstorfer, 1911 (Brunei)
T. o. albocostalis Fruhstorfer, 1911 (Java)

References

External links
Thaumantis at Markku Savela's Lepidoptera and Some Other Life Forms

Thaumantis
Butterflies described in 1824